The 2014–15 Quaid-e-Azam Trophy was the 57th edition of the Quaid-e-Azam Trophy, the premier domestic first-class cricket competition in Pakistan. It was contested by 26 teams representing 14 regional associations and 12 departments.

The Pakistan Cricket Board made major changes to the structure of the domestic first-class competitions for the 2014–15 season. For the first time in three years, all teams competed in the Quaid-e-Azam Trophy, which was split into two divisions – named as the Gold and Silver leagues; the departments had competed in their own President's Trophy for the previous two seasons. There was also a change to the ball, with Pakistan's Gray's of Cambridge replacing Kookaburra as the competition's supplier.

 (SNGPL) won the Quaid-e-Azam Trophy for second time, defeating  in the final after the match resulted in a draw; SNGPL had been set a nominal target of 208 runs to win late on the final day, but had amassed a 301 run lead in the first innings to secure the title.

Format
The structure of the domestic first-class cricket in Pakistan changed significantly for the 2014–15 season, with both regional associations and departments competing in the Quaid-e-Azam Trophy for the first time since 2011–12. The format of the competition also changed, reintroducing a two tier Gold and Silver League system with promotion and relegation.

The top six associations and departments from the Quaid-e-Azam Trophy and President's Trophy in 2013–14 were placed in the Gold League, and the remaining eight associations and six departments were placed in the Silver League. The Gold League was a played as a single round-robin group with a final contested between the two top teams at the end of the season. Teams in the Silver League were divided into two round-robin groups, with the leading four from each advancing to a knockout phase to determine the winner.

Promotions and relegations were rendered moot as the Quaid-e-Azam Trophy underwent further restructuring prior to the 2015–16 season.

Gold League

Group stage

Final

Silver League

Group stage

Knockout stage

Quarter-finals

Semi-finals

Final

Notes

References

Domestic cricket competitions in 2014–15
2014 in Pakistani cricket
2014–15 Quaid-e-Azam Trophy
Pakistani cricket seasons from 2000–01